"Let It Fly" is a song by American hip hop recording artist Maino, released on June 21, 2011 that serves as the lead single from his second studio album The Day After Tomorrow. The song features fellow American recording artist Roscoe Dash and was produced by K.E. and Shawn St. Cyr.

Remix
The official remix, released on September 12, 2011, features Roscoe Dash, DJ Khaled, Ace Hood, Meek Mill, Jim Jones & Wale. Maino included the remix on his 2012 mixtape I Am Who I Am.

Music video
On July 7, 2011, behind-the-scenes was released the footage of the music video . The music video, directed by Michael Dispenza, was filmed in Long Island and was released on August 3, 2011. The video features cameo appearances from Reek da Villian, Fred the Godson and Uncle Murda.

Charts

Release Information

Purchasable Release

References

2011 singles
2011 songs
Maino songs
Roscoe Dash songs
Atlantic Records singles
Songs written by Roscoe Dash
Songs written by Maino
Songs written by K.E. on the Track